The 1958–59 Sheffield Shield season was the 57th season of the Sheffield Shield, the domestic first-class cricket competition of Australia. New South Wales won the championship for the sixth consecutive year.

Table

Statistics

Most Runs
Gavin Stevens 859

Most Wickets
Richie Benaud 39

References

Sheffield Shield
Sheffield Shield
Sheffield Shield seasons